Khorramdarreh Rural District is in the Central District of Khorramdarreh County, Zanjan province, Iran. At the National Census of 2006, its population was 11,099 in 2,567 households. There were 11,920 inhabitants in 3,414 households at the following census of 2011. At the most recent census of 2016, the population of the rural district was 11,892 in 3,656 households. The largest of its 19 villages was Su Kahriz, with 2,560 people.

References 

Khorramdarreh County

Rural Districts of Zanjan Province

Populated places in Zanjan Province

Populated places in Khorramdarreh County